Godbolt is a surname. Notable people with the surname include:

A. J. Godbolt (born 1984), American soccer player
Jim Godbolt (1922–2013), English jazz writer and historian
John Godbolt ( 1582–1648), English judge and politician